Simon Wilson PLY (born 17 October 1958) is a Paralympic wheelchair fencer.

He was a member of the men's foil team for Great Britain at the 2012 Summer Paralympics.

References

1958 births
Living people
British male fencers
Paralympic wheelchair fencers of Great Britain
Place of birth missing (living people)
21st-century British people